In the 2000–01 season, the former Canadian National Women's Hockey League championship was won by the Beatrice Aeros team from Toronto. Jayna Hefford of Brampton Thunder had the best goalscoring record.

Final standings
Note: GP = Games played, W = Wins, L = Losses, T = Ties, GF = Goals for, GA = Goals against, Pts = Points.

The Vancouver Griffins played an 18 game exhibition schedule, against male and female Canadian Interuniversity Athletics Union teams, British Columbia and Alberta provincial women's teams, and NWHL teams.

Playoffs
March 18, 2001: Sainte-Julie Pantheres 2, Beatrice Aeros 2
March 19, 2001: Beatrice Aeros 8, Sainte-Julie Pantheres 1
Beatrice Aeros wins won the championship of the NWHL based on total goals scored.

Scoring leaders

References

External links
  Photos of NWHL Finals 2000-01

National Women's Hockey League (1999–2007) seasons
NWHL